The Jenny McCarthy Show is an American pop culture-based talk show television program that aired on VH1. The series was hosted by Jenny McCarthy and premiered on February 8, 2013. VH1 added seven episodes to the series' original eight-episode first season. Due to McCarthy joining The View, The Jenny McCarthy Show did not produce additional episodes beyond this.

Format
Filmed in New York City, The Jenny McCarthy Show features different celebrity guests along with trivia, games and discussion about recent pop culture news. Originally, Michelle Buteau from VH1's Best Week Ever delivered pop culture news via Skype but she has since essentially joined as a co-host and appears with guests in the studio. From the start, there was to be a different guest DJ and bartender but that plan has also seemingly fallen through.

Episodes

References

2010s American television talk shows
2013 American television series debuts
2013 American television series endings
English-language television shows
Television series by Embassy Row (production company)
Television series by Sony Pictures Television
VH1 original programming